"Alive" is a ballad recorded by the Bee Gees for their album  To Whom It May Concern.  It was the second and last single from the album released on 10 November 1972 worldwide. The song was credited to Barry and Maurice Gibb and produced by the Gibbs and their manager Robert Stigwood.

Composition and recording
It was another piano ballad (customary for Bee Gees singles during this period), which Barry has noted that he doesn't even remember writing. As mastered for the album, the inherent dynamic range in the vocal and piano has unfortunately been compressed almost out of existence, but it still comes across as an expressive ballad.

"Alive" was recorded on October 21, 1971, "My World" having also been recorded that previous week. Geoff Bridgford's drum work on this song, made his last appearance on any Bee Gees singles after he left in January 1972 (The previous single, "Run to Me" was recorded after Bridgford's departure).

Releases
The remastered version found on Tales from the Brothers Gibb somewhat increases the range missing from the original album release.  The single reached number 34 on the US charts in 1973 and debuted on #63 on that chart. It was the group's last top 40 hit in either the US or UK until "Jive Talkin'" in 1975. "Alive" was the group's last release on the Atco label. In 1973, the Bee Gees' manager, Robert Stigwood formed his own label, RSO Records, where the Gibb brothers enjoyed their most success. On the promo video for the single, which was originally made for the Dutch TV programme TopPop and was broadcast on 23 December 1972, Maurice first appears playing the piano, with Barry and Robin appearing only holding a microphone.

Reception
Billboard called the single a "dynamite, driving ballad."  Cash Box described it as a "fine selection in traditional Bee Gees fashion."

Personnel
Barry Gibb — lead vocals
Maurice Gibb — piano, bass
Geoff Bridgford — drums
Bill Shepherd — orchestral arrangement

Charts

Weekly charts

Year-end charts

References

1972 singles
Bee Gees songs
Demis Roussos songs
Songs written by Barry Gibb
Songs written by Maurice Gibb
Song recordings produced by Robert Stigwood
Song recordings produced by Barry Gibb
Song recordings produced by Robin Gibb
Song recordings produced by Maurice Gibb
1972 songs
Pop ballads